Dariush Ramezani was born in 1976 in Rasht, a northern city in Iran. He received his B.S. in Civil from Gilan University in Rasht in 2000. He began drawing cartoon in 1997 as a professional cartoonist. His cartoons and comic strips are published in some newspapers and magazines in Iran.
He has published some cartoons books and won some international and national prizes in cartoon contests.

Prizes and honors 

 First prize in International cartoon contest TURHAN SELCUK (Turkey, 2011)
 Honor prize in International cartoon contest PIRACICABA (Brazil, 2011)
 Honor prize in International cartoon contest CANADIAN BANANA (Montreal, Canada, 2010)
 First prize in International cartoon contest (Tabriz, Iran, 2008)
 First prize in UMO cartoon contest (India, 2007)
 Grand prize in EUROHUMOUR (Italy.2006)
 winning prize in international Web Cartoon (China, 2006)
 winning prize in International cartoon contest (Syria, 2006)
 Honor prize in International cartoon contest (Tehran, Iran, 2004)
 Honor prize in International cartoon contest (Tabriz, Iran, 2003)
 First prize in scholar cartoon contest (Iran, 1998)
 Special overseas junior prize in International Cartoon Contest YUMIURI (Japan, 1994)

Books

 Don’t Wake Me Up, Please! in 2005.
 The Lonely Little Ant in 2005.
 The Deer in 2007.
 Sometimes... in 2008.

Exhibitions

 More than 15 solo and group exhibitions in Iran.

References
 Page on Iranian House of Cartoon

External links

 Interview with Tabriz Cartoons website
 First prize in Turhan Selcuk 2011

1976 births
Iranian caricaturists
Iranian cartoonists
Iranian comics artists
Living people
People from Rasht